Masum Parvez Rubel (born 3 May 1960) is a Bangladeshi film actor, fighting director, producer and director. He is a current vice-president of the Bangladesh Film Artists' Association.

Rubel's career in the Bengali film industry began with the film Laraku.  He has appeared in over 200 films. His notable films are "Utthan Poton", Uddhar, Bir Purush, Bajromusti, and Vondo.

Career
In 1986, at the age of 26, Rubel made his acting debut in the film "Laraku", directed by Shahidul Islam Khokon. In his acting career, he has played over two hundred films.

On 28 January 2022, Rubel became a vice-president of the Bangladesh Film Artists' Association after bagging 191 votes. Dipjol also became.

Filmography

Rubel and Khokon Collaboration

Personal life
Rubel has a son, Niloy Parvez.

References

External links
 

1960 births
Living people
20th-century Bangladeshi male actors
21st-century Bangladeshi actors
Bangladeshi film producers
Bangladeshi male film actors
Bangladeshi film directors